Isentropic expansion waves are created when a supersonic flow is redirected along a curved surface. These waves are studied to obtain a relation between deflection angle and Mach number. Each wave in this case is a Mach wave, so it is at an angle  , where M is the Mach number immediately before the wave. Expansion waves are divergent because as the flow expands the value of Mach number increases, thereby decreasing the Mach angle.

We have oriented the coordinate system orthogonal to the wave. We write the basic (continuity, momentum and 1st, 2nd law of thermodynamics) equations for this infinitesimal control volume.

Assumptions:
 Steady flow.
 Negligible body forces.
 Adiabatic flow.
 No work terms.
 Negligible gravitational effect.

Relation between θ,M and v
The continuity equation is,

  .......(1.1)

First term is zero by assumption(1).

 Now,   

 or    ......  (1.2)

Now we consider the momentum equation for normal and tangential to shock.

For - component, 
 ......(1.3)

Second term of L.H.S and first term of R.H.S are zero due to assumption (2) and (1) respectively.

Then,
 

Or using continuity,

 

 

 But,

 so,
 and

   ......(1.4)

Derivation of Prandtl-Meyer supersonic expansion function

We skip the analysis of the -component of the momentum and move on to the first law of thermodynamics, which is

  .........(1.5)

First term of L.H.S,next three terms of L.H.S and first term of R.H.S are zero due to assumption (3),(4) and (1) respectively.

where,
 

For our control volume we obtain

 

This may be simplified as

 

Expanding and simplifying in the limit to first order, we get

 

If we confine to ideal gases, so

  ......(1.6)

Above equation relates the differential changes in velocity and temperature.

 

Using equation 1.6

 

 

Hence,

  .....(1.7)

Combining (1.4) and (1.7)

  .....(1.8)

We generally apply the above equation to negative , let .

 

Leading to Prandtl-Meyer supersonic expansion function,

References

 

Thermodynamic processes